João Domingues was the defending champion but chose not to defend his title.

Gianluigi Quinzi won the title after defeating Gian Marco Moroni 6–2, 6–2 in the final.

Seeds

Draw

Finals

Top half

Bottom half

References
Main Draw
Qualifying Draw

Venice Challenge Save Cup - Singles
2018 Singles